William Augustus Bootle (August 19, 1902 – January 25, 2005) was an American attorney and a United States district judge of the United States District Court for the Middle District of Georgia noted for helping oversee desegregation in the Southern United States.

Education and career

Born on August 19, 1902, in Walterboro, South Carolina, Bootle received an Artium Baccalaureus degree in 1924 from Mercer University and a Bachelor of Laws in 1925 from the Walter F. George School of Law at Mercer University. There he was a member of Phi Delta Theta. He entered private practice in Macon, Georgia from 1925 to 1928 and again from 1933 to 1954. He was a part-time professor at Mercer University from 1926 to 1937 and served as acting dean from 1933 to 1937. He was an Assistant United States Attorney for the Middle District of Georgia from 1928 to 1929 and was the United States Attorney for the Middle District of Georgia from 1929 to 1933.

Federal judicial service

Bootle was nominated by President Dwight D. Eisenhower on May 3, 1954, to a seat on the United States District Court for the Middle District of Georgia vacated by Judge Abraham Benjamin Conger. He was confirmed by the United States Senate on May 18, 1954, and received his commission on May 20, 1954. He served as Chief Judge from 1961 to 1972. He assumed senior status on March 11, 1972. His service terminated on January 25, 2005, due to his death in Macon.

Notable case

Bootle ordered the first admission of an African-American to the University of Georgia in 1961 (Hamilton E. Holmes and Charlayne Hunter).

Death

Bootle's wife of more than 70 years, Virginia Childs Bootle, died on June 24, 2004. Bootle died at his home in 2005 at the age of 102.

Honors

The federal building and courthouse at Macon, Georgia was renamed the William Augustus Bootle Federal Building and United States Courthouse in June 1998. In 1982, Bootle was awarded an honorary Doctor of Laws degree from Mercer University.

See also 
List of centenarians (jurists and practitioners of law)
List of United States federal judges by longevity of service

References

Further reading

External links 
 
 Phi Delta Theta biography
 SR 604 - A resolution by the Georgia Senate "honoring the extraordinary life and career of the Honorable William Augustus Bootle; and for other purposes."
 Unsung Foot Soldier Project at the University of Georgia biography 
 "Judge Bootle Dies at 102; Funeral Set Saturday" - Mercer University press release
 "Judge who desegregated University of Georgia dies" - MSNBC

1902 births
2005 deaths
20th-century American lawyers
Georgia (U.S. state) state court judges
University of Georgia
Baptists from Georgia (U.S. state)
American centenarians
Men centenarians
Judges of the United States District Court for the Middle District of Georgia
United States district court judges appointed by Dwight D. Eisenhower
20th-century American judges
Mercer University alumni
People from Macon, Georgia
People from Walterboro, South Carolina
Assistant United States Attorneys
Baptists from South Carolina